Wellington Street bus station was a Transperth bus station located next to Perth railway station in the Perth central business district, Western Australia from 1973 until 2014. It was demolished to make way for Perth Busport.

History
Wellington Street bus station was opened on 2 March 1973 as Perth Central bus station by Premier John Tonkin. It was renamed Wellington Street bus station in 1989 to distinguish it from Esplanade Busport.

After just over 40 years of service, the majority of bus services were moved to the temporary Roe Street bus station on 12 January 2014. Wellington Street bus station remained in use for a further two weeks due to roadworks in the central business district, temporarily servicing Beaufort Street bus services, before finally closing on 27 January 2014 and being demolished soon after. The station was replaced by the new underground Perth Busport on the same site. To cater for the remaining bus services during the construction period, a temporary replacement Wellington Street bus station opened on 6 July 2014, occupying some of the original site. This closed on 1 February 2015.

It had 17 stands and was served by 34 Transperth routes operated by Path Transit, Swan Transit and Transdev WA.

References

Demolished buildings and structures in Western Australia
Buildings and structures demolished in 2014
Former bus stations
Bus stations in Perth, Western Australia
Perth City Link
Transport infrastructure completed in 1973
1973 establishments in Australia
2014 disestablishments in Australia